Kathleen Rose Perkins (born November 15, 1974) is an American actress.

Life and career
Perkins was born in New Baltimore, Michigan, the daughter of Leonard and Donna Perkins. She graduated from Anchor Bay High School (1992) and enrolled in Western Michigan University, where she graduated with a degree in Musical Arts. Her passion for the theater blossomed when she got involved with the Anchor Bay school's performing arts club, which was headed by Joseph P. Abell.

Her career began in 2001 with a role in the television series The Fighting Fitzgeralds. She had a recurring role as Principal Duffy in the Fox sitcom 'Til Death  and has made guest appearances in over 20 other television series, including NCIS: Los Angeles, Trust Me, Gary Unmarried, Tell Me You Love Me, Castle, The Game and The Exes, among others. Perkins also has appeared in several TV movies.

She had a starring role as Carol Rance in the BBC-Showtime comedy series Episodes.

Filmography

Film

Television

References

External links
 

Living people
1974 births
American television actresses
People from New Baltimore, Michigan
Actresses from Michigan
Western Michigan University alumni
21st-century American actresses
American film actresses